Tony J. Asamali (born 16 July 1947) is a Filipino former swimmer. He competed in seven events at the 1968 Summer Olympics.

References

1947 births
Living people
Filipino male swimmers
Olympic swimmers of the Philippines
Swimmers at the 1968 Summer Olympics
People from Sulu
Asian Games medalists in swimming
Asian Games silver medalists for the Philippines
Asian Games bronze medalists for the Philippines
Swimmers at the 1966 Asian Games
Medalists at the 1966 Asian Games
21st-century Filipino people
20th-century Filipino people